Mae Koime (born 14 December 1983 in Kerema, Gulf Province) is a Papua New Guinean sprinter.

Described as "the fastest ever female sprinter in Papua New Guinea", as Papua New Guinea's "star sprinter", and as Oceania's "fastest woman", Koime has represented her country at the 2004 Summer Olympics, the 2006 Commonwealth Games, and the 2003, 2005 and 2007 World Championships in Athletics.

She set a national record for Papua New Guinea at the Athens Olympics when she ran the 100 metres with a time of 12.00 seconds.

Competing at the Oceania Grand Prix in June 2008, she finished first in the 100 metre sprint, with a time of 11.70 seconds, and in the 200 metre sprint, with a time of 24.11. Koime finished first overall at the international Grand Prix.

Koime represented Papua New Guinea at the 2008 Summer Olympics in Beijing competing at the 100 metres sprint. In her first round heat she placed sixth in a time of 11.68 which was not enough to advance to the second round.

Achievements

References

External links

 

1983 births
Living people
Papua New Guinean female sprinters
Papua New Guinean female hurdlers
Olympic athletes of Papua New Guinea
Athletes (track and field) at the 2004 Summer Olympics
Athletes (track and field) at the 2006 Commonwealth Games
Athletes (track and field) at the 2008 Summer Olympics
People from Gulf Province
Commonwealth Games competitors for Papua New Guinea